Mišo Krstičević (born 19 February 1958) is a Croatian professional football manager and former player. He is currently the manager of third-tier club Jadran LP.

Club career
Krstičević began his career in 1972 when he made a senior debut as a 14-year-old for Jadran Ploče. The same year he was spotted by Neretva Metković. After joining Neretva, he went to their youth academy. He debuted for them in 1975 and played with them until 1978 when he was spotted and bought by Hajduk Split.

In his first season at Hajduk, he managed to win the Yugoslav championship in 1979. He played a huge part in that winning season by playing 33 times and becoming a first team regular. Despite having world class teammates such as Zlatko Vujović and Ivan Gudelj he still managed to hold his regular team status. He played in the 1979–80 European Cup where Hajduk reached the quarter-finals. He made a total of 206 appearances and 36 goals for Hajduk. Krstičević is also remembered for scoring the last goal for Hajduk on their old Stari plac stadium in 1979.

In 1983, he left Hajduk and went to Rijeka. After one year at Rijeka, he joined Velež Mostar where he won the Yugoslav Cup in 1986. In 1986, he left Velež and went to Rot-Weiß Oberhausen. After playing two more years at Oberhausen, he retired in 1988.

International career
Krstičević made his international debut for Yugoslavia on 1 April 1979 against Cyprus. He won a gold medal at the 1979 Mediterranean Games and a bronze medal at the 1980 Summer Olympics. He scored his only goal for Yugoslavia against Romania in 1980 at the Balkan Cup. He played his last international game against Romania on 27 August 1980. He made a total of seven appearances and scored one goal for Yugoslavia.

Managerial career

Early career
Krstičević began his managerial career in his first club, Jadran Ploče, before joining Hajduk Split in 2004 as an assistant to Blaž Slišković. Although he led Hajduk to the eventual title, Slišković was sacked before the championship ended and Krstičević left the club as well, taking over third division team Trogir. Krstičević led Trogir to promotion to the second division, but then he surprisingly left the club, once again taking over his first club Jadran Ploče in September 2007. He stayed in Jadran for four seasons, keeping the mediocre club constantly near the top of the league.
In 2011, Krstičević took over KF Tirana, winning the national cup but disappointingly finishing fifth in the national championship.

Hajduk Split
He left Albania in the summer of 2011, taking over the under-19 team of Hajduk Split. Under his guidance Hajduk's youth team dominated the national championship in front of recently much renowned Dinamo Zagreb's youth team. His U-19 team won the Croatian U-19 league in 2012. After Hajduk's first team manager Krasimir Balakov left for 1. FC Kaiserslautern, Krstičević was appointed as the new manager. He finished second in the 2011–12 Prva HNL but it was thanks to Balakov's previous results. In the 2012–13 UEFA Europa League he was kicked out in the third qualifying round by Inter Milan after a 2–3 aggregate loss. In the 2012–13 Prva HNL, he started well by finishing first after the starting four matches. After his first defeat in the new season against Lokomotiva, the team started to decline which caused bad results and low team morale. After the autumn part of the season, the team finished second in the league and qualified for the 2012–13 Croatian Cup semi-final.

In late April 2013, after he suffered a 1–2 loss against Rijeka on home ground, he was sacked by Hajduk chairman Marin Brbić due to a string of poor results.

Later career
In May 2013, he joined the national team of Croatia as an assistant manager to Igor Štimac. After a series of bad results he left the national team alongside Štimac on 16 October 2013.

At the beginning of 2015, Krstičević took a managerial place in Zrinjski Mostar but it lasted only a few months.

Between 2015 and 2019, Krstičević was the manager of Iranian Second League club Mes Rafsanjan on three occasions (2015–2016, 2016–2017 and 2018–2019).

Career statistics

International goals

Honours

Player
Hajduk Split 
Yugoslav First League: 1978–79

Velež Mostar 
Yugoslav Cup: 1985–86

Yugoslavia
Mediterranean Games: 1979
Summer Olympics Third place: 1984

Manager
Trogir 
Croatian Third League (South): 2006–07

Tirana 
Albanian Cup: 2010–11

Hajduk Split U19
Croatian U-19 League: 2011–12

References

External links
 

1958 births
Living people
Sportspeople from Metković
Association football defenders
Yugoslav footballers
Yugoslavia international footballers
Mediterranean Games gold medalists for Yugoslavia
Mediterranean Games medalists in football
Competitors at the 1979 Mediterranean Games
Olympic footballers of Yugoslavia
Footballers at the 1980 Summer Olympics
HNK Hajduk Split players
HNK Rijeka players
FK Velež Mostar players
Rot-Weiß Oberhausen players
Yugoslav First League players
2. Bundesliga players
Yugoslav expatriate footballers
Expatriate footballers in West Germany
Yugoslav expatriate sportspeople in West Germany
Croatian football managers
HNK Trogir managers
KF Tirana managers
HNK Hajduk Split managers
HŠK Zrinjski managers
Mes Rafsanjan F.C. managers
Shahin Bushehr F.C. managers
Kategoria Superiore managers
Premier League of Bosnia and Herzegovina managers
Croatian expatriate football managers
Expatriate football managers in Albania
Croatian expatriate sportspeople in Albania
Expatriate football managers in Iran
Croatian expatriate sportspeople in Iran